The 2018–19 UC Davis Aggies women's basketball team represented University of California, Davis during the 2018–19 NCAA Division I women's basketball season. The Aggies, led by ninth year head coach Jennifer Gross, played their home games at The Pavilion as members of the Big West Conference. They finished the season 25–7, 15–1 in Big West play to win the Big West Regular Season. They also won the Big West women's tournament and earned an automatic trip to the NCAA women's tournament for the first time since 2011. They lost to Stanford in the first round.

Roster

Schedule and results

|-
!colspan=9 style=| Exhibition

|-
!colspan=9 style=| Non-conference regular season

|-
!colspan=9 style=| Big West regular season

|-
!colspan=9 style=| Big West Women's Tournament

|-
!colspan=9 style=| NCAA Women's Tournament

See also
2018–19 UC Davis Aggies men's basketball team

References

UC Davis Aggies women's basketball seasons
UC Davis
UC Davis